Datuk Seri Panglima Masidi Manjun (born 1 June 1951) is a Malaysian politician who has served as the State Minister of Finance of Sabah since January 2023 and State Minister of Local Government and Housing of Sabah from September 2020 to January 2023 in the Gabungan Rakyat Sabah (GRS) state administration under Chief Minister Hajiji Noor and Member of the Sabah State Legislative Assembly (MLA) for Karanaan since March 2004. He was the state COVID-19 spokesman and coordinating minister of the GRS state government of Sabah. During the COVID-19 pandemic, he spoke frequently on the response of Sabah towards the pandemic. On 13 January 2023, Joachim Gunsalam took over the duties from him. He is a member of Parti Gagasan Rakyat Sabah (GAGASAN), a component party of the GRS coalition. He has also served as the Deputy President of GAGASAN since February 2023. He also served as the State Deputy Chairman of the Malaysian United Indigenous Party of Sabah from April 2019 to his resignation from the party in December 2022 and Chairman of the Board of Directors of the Universiti Malaysia Sabah (UMS) from August 2020 to January 2021.

Educational background 
Masidi obtained a degree of Bachelor of Laws from the University of London in 1977 and became Barrister-at-Law with Honours at Lincoln's Inn, London in 1979.

Career

Legal practice and public service 
Masidi entered the State Public Service in 1977 as a legal adviser and prosecutor at the Forestry Department. He was admitted as an Advocate and Solicitor of the High Court of Sabah and Sarawak in 1979, the same year he was appointed as Tuaran District Officer. He was transferred to Sandakan in the similar position in 1982 before being promoted as Permanent Secretary of Ministry of Culture, Youth and Sports in 1984. In 1987, he was made a Senior State Counsel in the State Attorney-General's Chambers. He left the State Public Service in 1989 to join private sector.

Private sector 
Masidi served as Chairman of Institute of Development Studies of Sabah from 1994 to 2004 and member of board of directors of Sabah Development Bank during that time. He held directorship in various companies including Chase Perdana Berhad, Sitt Tatt Berhad and Bank Rakyat. He is Chairman of Malaysian Bioeconomy Development Corporation since 24 July 2020.

Politics 
Masidi joined politics in 2004 as he was nominated by United Malays National Organisation (UMNO) as candidate for Karanaan state constituency. He subsequently won the election and holds the seat for four consecutive terms. He is currently serving the fifth term in Karanaan following his victory in the 16th state election under the banner of Malaysian United Indigenous Party (BERSATU).

He rose as Minister of State for Youth and Sports in 2004. He then became Minister of State for Tourism, Culture and Environment from 2006 to 2018 and Minister of State charged with education during that time. He also served as Deputy Chief Minister post 14th general election for two days. He left UMNO in 2018 to join BERSATU and became the latter's state liaison deputy chairman subsequently.

Honours 
Masidi was bestowed with the following honours:

Honours of Malaysia 
 :
  Member of the Order of the Defender of the Realm (AMN) (1998)
  Officer of the Order of the Defender of the Realm (KMN) (2006)
 :
  Commander of the Order of Kinabalu (PGDK) – Datuk  (1996)
  Grand Commander of the Order of Kinabalu (SPDK) – Datuk Seri Panglima (2013)

Election results

References 

1951 births
Living people
Malaysian politicians
Members of the Order of the Defender of the Realm
Kadazan-Dusun people
Officers of the Order of the Defender of the Realm
Commanders of the Order of Kinabalu
Malaysian Muslims
Grand Commanders of the Order of Kinabalu
Former United Malays National Organisation politicians
Former Malaysian United Indigenous Party politicians